The 1916–17 Army Cadets men's basketball team represented United States Military Academy during the 1916–17 college men's basketball season. The head coach was Arthur Conard, coaching his first season with the Cadets. The team captain was John Cole.

Schedule

|-

References

Army Black Knights men's basketball seasons
Army
Army Cadets Men's Basketball Team
Army Cadets Men's Basketball Team